Therian may refer to:

 In taxonomy, a member of the mammalian subclass Theria, consisting of marsupial and placental mammals
 A member of the contemporary subculture of therianthropy, based on a spiritual or psychological identification, or both, with animals

See also
Therion (disambiguation)